Home Is Where is an American emo band from Palm Coast, Florida. The band has released two EPs and one album. Their first EP, Our Mouths to Smile, was released in 2019. Their debut album, I Became Birds, was released in 2021 and brought them considerably more attention, including landing on numerous end of the year lists. In 2022, they released a split EP with Denton, Texas emo band Record Setter titled dissection lesson.

Band members 
 Current
 Brandon MacDonald – vocals, harmonica, singing saw 
 Tilley Komorny – guitar
 Josiah Gardella – drums 
 Connor O'brien – bass

Former
 Trace George – guitar (2017–2020)

Discography

Studio album

Extended play albums

References

American emo musical groups
Emo musical groups from Florida